Tutaghaji (also Romanized as Tūtāghājī; also known as Tūt Āqā Jānī) is a village in Qaleh Juq Rural District, Anguran District, Mahneshan County, Zanjan Province, Iran. At the 2006 census, its population was 41, in 10 families.

References 

Populated places in Mahneshan County